Jimmy Lee may refer to:

People (as a full name)
Jimmy Lee (banker) (James B. Lee, Jr.), investment banker and financier for JP Morgan Chase, Chase Manhattan bank and originally Chemical Bank
Jimmy Lee (journalist) (born c. 1970), Korean-American journalist
 Jimmy Lee (footballer) (1892–1955), footballer for Aston Villa and Stoke
Jimmy Lee Duggar (1936–2009), father of American reality TV star Jim Bob Duggar, see 19 Kids and Counting

Songs 
 "Jimmy Lee" (song), a 1987 hit single by Aretha Franklin

Fictional characters 
 Jimmy Lee, character in video game series Double Dragon
Jimmy Lee Holt, a character on the television soap opera General Hospital

People (as a first name)

Jimmy Lee Swaggart, a televangelist, known for his involvement in a high-profile 1988 sex scandal
Jimmy Lee Smith, convicted of murder documented in The Onion Field
Jimmy Lee Gray (1948–1983), convicted murderer executed in Mississippi
Jimmy Lee Fautheree, an American rockabilly singer
Jimmy Lee Sudduth (1910–2007), outsider artist and blues musician from Fayette, Alabama

See also 
 Jim Lee (disambiguation)
 James Lee (disambiguation)